Beech Lanes is a small area of Harborne in Birmingham, England, located on the border with Sandwell.

Areas of Birmingham, West Midlands